Hong Kong Satellite Television (HKSTV, traditional Chinese: 香港衛視, simplified Chinese: 香港卫视) is a non-domestic satellite television network consisting of two Mandarin language channels, owned by Hong Kong Satellite TV International Media Group (HKS), based in Hong Kong. HKSTV was available in Hong Kong via Now TV and Cable TV Hong Kong between 2011 and 2014. It is now available over the internet in Taiwan via 5TV (China United) and also in Mainland China via CNTV. The HKSTV signal can be picked up via Satellite in over 140 countries world-wide. HKSTV distinguishes itself from other channels by using a mix of foreign and Chinese television hosts.

The company is registered in and named after Hong Kong, but most of its programmes are produced in mainland China.

History
HKSTV was given licenses for six separate Channels and one Internet-based television Channel by the Hong Kong government in 2008. In 2010, HKSTV began broadcasting into Hong Kong. In 2011, HKSTV became the first Hong Kong television station to be broadcast into Mainland China via CNTV. In 2013, HKSTV began broadcasting across Taiwan via 5TV, and can be reached by every household in Taiwan.

Programming
HKSTV broadcasts a variety of programming in Mandarin Chinese with a focus on news programmes, documentaries and panel shows including;
 两岸民声 (People's voice)
 记录 (Documentary)
 东边西边 (East Meets West)

Former programming
Kunlun Fight

Hosts
HKSTV employs Foreign and Chinese hosts. Current and former hosts include;
张宗月 (zhāng zōng yuè)
王明青 (wáng míng qīng)
安娜 (ān nà)
高璐 (gāo lù)
马艳丽 (mǎ  yàn lì)
 麦子 (mài zi)
那晴 (nà qíng )
宋博宁 (sòng bó nìng)
宋思轩 (sòng sī xuān)
孙卉 (sūn huì)
王晓耕 (wáng xiǎo gēng)
徐樱子 (xú yīng zǐ)
叶虹韵 (yè hóng yùn)
杨阳 (yáng yáng)
杨洋 (yáng yáng)
蝶丹 (dié dān)
Hazza

External links
 Official HKS website

Television channels and stations established in 2010
Television stations in Hong Kong